Nedging is a village and former civil parish on the B1115 road, now in the parish of Nedging-with-Naughton, in the Babergh district, in the county of Suffolk, England. The nearest town is Hadleigh, there is also the hamlet of Nedging Tye nearby. In 1931 the civil parish had a population of 155. On 1 April 1935 it was merged with Naughton to create Nedging-with-Naughton.

The parish church of St Mary is a Grade I listed medieval church.

Nedging-with-Naughton parish make-up 
Naughton
Nedging
Nedging Tye

References

Other sources
 Philip's Street Atlas: Suffolk (2007). Philip's, p. 79.

External links 
 Nedging at genuki.org.uk

Villages in Suffolk
Former civil parishes in Suffolk
Babergh District